Dresbach is an unincorporated community in Dresbach Township, Winona County, Minnesota, United States.

The community is located on the west side of the Mississippi River along Interstate 90 between Winona and La Crosse.  U.S. Highways 61 and 14 are briefly co-signed with Interstate 90 at this point.

Dresbach is located along the Mississippi River.  Nearby places include Winona, Dakota, Nodine, La Crescent, La Crosse, Onalaska, and Great River Bluffs State Park.  Local businesses include the Dresbach travel information center, and Lock and Dam No. 7 on the Mississippi River.

History
Both the community and township were named after George B. Dresbach, who founded the community and was a representative in the state legislature.  The post office was established in 1858 as Dresbach City, then changed to Sherwood in 1864, then back to Dresbach in 1866.  The community once had a station on the former Chicago, Milwaukee and St. Paul Railroad, a sawmill, and several brickyards, lead mines, and limestone and sandstone quarries.

References

Former municipalities in Minnesota
Unincorporated communities in Minnesota
Unincorporated communities in Winona County, Minnesota
Minnesota populated places on the Mississippi River